Andrea Alciato (8 May 149212 January 1550), commonly known as Alciati (Andreas Alciatus), was an Italian jurist and writer.  He is regarded as the founder of the French school of legal humanists.

Biography

Alciati was born in Alzate Brianza, near Milan, and settled in France in the early 16th century. He displayed great literary skill in his exposition of the laws, and was one of the first to interpret the civil law by the history, languages and literature of antiquity, and to substitute original research for the servile interpretations of the glossators. He published many legal works, and some annotations on Tacitus and accumulated a sylloge of Roman inscriptions from Milan and its territories, as part of his preparation for his history of Milan, written in 1504–05.

Among his several appointments, Alciati taught Law at the University of Bourges between 1529 and 1535. It was Guillaume Budé who encouraged the call to Bourges at the time. Pierre Bayle, in his General Dictionary (article "Alciat"), relates that he greatly increased his salary there, by the "stratagem" of arranging to get a job offer from the University of Bologna and using it as a negotiation point .

Alciati is most famous for his Emblemata, published in dozens of editions from 1531 onward. This collection of short Latin verse texts and accompanying woodcuts created an entire European genre, the emblem book, which attained enormous popularity in continental Europe and Great Britain.

Alciati died at Pavia in 1550.

Works

 Annotationes in tres libros Codicis (1515)
 Emblematum libellus (1531)
 
 Opera omnia (Basel 1546–49)
 Rerum Patriae, seu Historiae Mediolanensis, Libri IV (Milan, 1625) a history of Milan, written in 1504–05.
 De formula Romani Imperii (Basilae: Ioannem Oporinum, 1559, editio princeps)

Quotation

References

External links

 
Alciato at Glasgow – Reproductions of 22 editions of Alciato's emblems from 1531 to 1621
Description, Reproduction and translation Memorial University of Newfoundland
Emblemata Latin text, Antwerp 1577, full digital facsimile, CAMENA Project

1492 births
1550 deaths
16th-century Italian jurists
16th-century Latin-language writers
16th-century Italian historians
Italian Renaissance humanists
People from the Province of Como